Ocean Odyssey is the 2005-06 FIRST Lego League challenge theme. It centered on topics relating to the world's oceans and oceanography. The challenge was developed with the collaboration of the Woods Hole Oceanographic Institution and the Monterey Bay Aquarium Research Institute.

Project
Teams were tasked with choosing an ocean activity or resource and research its impact on ocean health and productivity. From this, they would create an innovative solution to problems they encounter with the ocean. At competition, teams presented their research and solution to judges.

Gameplay
The table performance portion of Ocean Odyssey is played on a 4 ft by 8 ft field rimmed by wood boards. At competition, two of these fields are placed together to form an 8 ft square. In each -minute match, a team competes on each field with their robot to earn up to 400 points manipulating the mission models.

One of the mission models, Release the Dolphin, straddles both fields in the center. This model earns points for the team that releases the dolphin first.

The touch penalty objects are shipping crate models. All 8 are worth up to 5 points each depending on their location on the field, but are removed from play every time the robot is touched outside of base.

Missions

All of the Ocean Odyssey missions center on the oceans:
 Deploy the Submarine - up to 40 points
 Conduct a Transect Mapping - up to 75 points
 Protect the Pump Station - 40 points
 Service the Pipeline - 40 points
 Sample One Species From Among Others - 35 points
 Release the Dolphin - 25 points
 Decide About an Artificial Reef - 40 points
 Clean Up a Cargo Shipping Accident - 30 points
 Shipping Crates - up to 40 points
 Find and Recover Archaeological Artifacts - up to 35 points

References

FIRST Lego League games
2005 in robotics